The 1895 Arkansas Industrial Cardinals football team represented the University of Arkansas during the 1895 college football season. During the 1895 season, Arkansas Industrial played no intercollegiate football games.  Its only game was against Fort Smith High School, resulting in a 30–0 victory for Arkansas.

Schedule

References

Arkansas
Arkansas Razorbacks football seasons
Arkansas Industrial Cardinals football